The Guy Bartley House is a historic house at the northeast corner of Elm and Fifth Streets in Leslie, Arkansas.  It is a two-story wood-frame structure, with a gambrel roof and wood shingle siding.  A single-story porch wraps around one side of the house, and has apparently been partly enclosed.  The front and rear roof elevations each have large gabled wall dormers.  Built in 1906, the house is a regionally unusual example of Colonial Revival architecture in with stylistic elements more commonly found in New England.

The house was listed on the National Register of Historic Places in 1993.

See also
National Register of Historic Places listings in Searcy County, Arkansas

References

Houses on the National Register of Historic Places in Arkansas
Colonial Revival architecture in Arkansas
Houses completed in 1906
Houses in Searcy County, Arkansas
National Register of Historic Places in Searcy County, Arkansas
1906 establishments in Arkansas